Kishakajan (also Romanized as Kīshākajān) is a village in Chini Jan Rural District, in the Central District of Rudsar County, Gilan Province, Iran. At the 2006 census, its population was 772, in 220 families.

References 

Populated places in Rudsar County